Huw Owen Pritchard (23 July 1928 – 9 August 2019) was a Welsh-born Canadian chemist who was a Distinguished Research Professor Emeritus at York University.

References

1928 births
2019 deaths
Academic staff of York University
British emigrants to Canada
Canadian chemists